Tomás Bernardo Domínguez Taunton (born 14 February 1986 in Mexico City) is a former Mexican professional footballer. He last played as a midfielder for Correcaminos UAT in the Liga de Ascenso.

Domínguez formerly played in Liga MX with Atlante, making his top-level debut on 23 February 2008 against Tigres UANL.

References

External links
 
 
Tomas Dominguez's Debut Article

1986 births
Living people
Footballers from Mexico City
Association football midfielders
Mexican footballers
Atlante F.C. footballers
Lobos BUAP footballers
Alacranes de Durango footballers
Correcaminos UAT footballers
Liga MX players